Sadhyam ( Possible) is a 2010 Telugu film, produced by D. Ratna Kumar, D. Karnakar, D. Suresh on Kumar Brothers Cinema banner and directed by Karthikeya Gopalakrishna. Jagapati Babu and Priyamani starred in lead roles and music is composed by Chinni Charan. The film is recorded as flop at the box office.

Plot
The film begins with Suhani a timorous even to the piety stuff. Exploiting it, all do derision towards her and she faces amounting to torture. One night, Suhani rescues a tycoon Krishna Prasad from danger. At that moment, Krishna Prasad proclaims that he is ready to bestow anything as a return gift. Then, Suhani notices the licensed revolver of Krishna Prasad and aspires to possess it. To be strong and eliminate all men that hoodwinked her in life. Krishna Prasad hands over it to Suhani for seeking vengeance.

Firstly, she proceeds for her bestie Anita and moves rearward. Suhani used to lead a jollity life with her parents. Anita is her neighbor & childhood buddy and they are reciprocity. Anyhow, Anita is internally selfish and always envies Suhani. Once, the two attend an interview when Anita backstabs Suhani by slandering her for prostitution. But she is somehow acquitted as not guilty. Now Suhani reaches Anita's residence. On the verge to shoot, she spots her insane who has been diddled by her chairperson and turned into a toy. Consoling Anita, Suhani continues and remembers a few more incidents.

After that turmoil, Suhani acquires a job in a fine company which her parents also encourage. On her first day, she is acquainted with a rough guy Sandeep in a tiff, that end he chases her as white on rice. After a series of donnybrook, Sandeep reveals that he is all around in the things that happened in her life. He has been observing Suhani for a long time and dear her cute naughtiness. Plus, Sandeep is the one who vindicated her and gained employment in his own company. Forthwith, she too loves him and they consummate. Therefrom, his whereabouts are not known, so, she declared him a betray. Currently, Suhani approaches Sandeep where she is startled to notice that Sandeep died 3 months back. Next, Suhani reads Sandeep's diary through which she realizes that Sandeep wants to approach her parents for their nuptial as a surprise on Suhani's birthday. Unfortunately, he is strangled on the same day.

Presently, devastated Suhani reaches a graveyard, staggers before her parents' tombs, and recollects another past. On the eve of her birthday, their family reaches the temple where Suhani's father Subramanyam spots Arms trafficking of a notorious gang. Immediately, he informs the Police when astoundingly, Sandeep is shown as a secret agent to which everyone is unbeknownst. He bolts the entire wing but tragically, he is killed in that attack. Eventually, Suhani's parents are slaughtered by the same gangsters which made her paranoid. Ultimately, Suhani backs to Krishna Prasad when as a flabbergast, she shoots him at point blank range. Here countless facts have been disclosed that Krishna Prasad is the one that pulled Anita's leg. The forefront of the vicious criminals who slain Suhani's parents. Above all, he is none other than Sandeep's father who assassinated him. At last, Suhani is under jolt by the re-entry of Sandeep that has been safeguarded from the danger. Finally, the movie ends on a happy note with the fuse of Sandeep & Suhani.

Cast
Jagapati Babu as Sandeep, an undercover CBI officer
Priyamani as Suhani
Keerthi Chawla as Anita
Kota Srinivasa Rao as Suhani's father
Tanikella Bharani as Krishna Prasad
CVL Narasimha Rao
Jakki
Saptagiri
Pragathi
Madhumani
Bhargavi

Soundtrack

Music composed & lyrics written by Chinni Charan. Music released on Madhura Entertainment Audio Company.

References

External links

2010s Telugu-language films
2010 films
Indian films about revenge